Stereoplasmoceratidae is an extinct family of actively mobile aquatic carnivorous cephalopods belonging to the subclass Orthoceratoidea endemic to what would be Asia during the Ordovician living from 490—457.5 mya, existing for approximately .

Taxonomy
Stereoplasmoceratidae was named by Kobayashi (1934). It was assigned to Pseudorthocerataceae by Teichert et al. (1964).

See also

 Paleontology

References

Orthocerida
Ordovician cephalopods
Ordovician first appearances
Late Ordovician extinctions
Prehistoric animals of Asia